Utopia is the fifth studio album by gothic industrial metal band Gothminister, released on 17 May 2013 on the label AFM Records. It is their first album following the signing with AFM in December 2012.

Track listing

Reception
The album got a mixed review by Ulf Kubanke for the website laut.de while Eric May of the New Noise Magazine gave it a rather positive review.

References

External links

Utopia at RateYourMusic

2013 albums
Gothminister albums
AFM Records albums